"C'est moi" (translates into English as "it's me") is a French language song by Marie-Mai. It is the first single released from Marie-Mai's third album Version 3.0. It was released as a digital download on 4 September 2009. The song was written by Fred St-Gelais and Marie-Mai.

Music video
The video was filmed by director Bernard Nadeau. The video premiered on 23 September 2009. The music video started with a bogus opening credit and a group of doctors preparing for a surgery on cyborg Marie-Mai. She and the doctors appear to move in jerking manner. The doctors are enhancing her body which makes her able to tirelessly run and able to lift heavy weights.

Chart performance
"C'est moi" debuted on the Canadian Hot 100 on 21 September 2009 at number 90.

References

2012 singles
Songs written by Fred St-Gelais
2009 songs
Musicor Records singles
Music videos featuring gynoids